Ashk may refer to:
 Ashk (given name), a male given name of Iranian origin
 Ashk, Iran, a village in South Khorasan Province, Iran
 Ashk, Yazd, village in Yazd Province, Iran
 Ashk (TV series), a 2012 Pakistani drama serial